Alpaslan-1 Dam is a dam and hydroelectric power station in Muş Province, Turkey. The foundation stone for the dam was laid in 1994 and construction on the dam superstructure began in 1998. The dam began to impound its reservoir in 2008 and the first of four 40 MW generators was operational in 2009. The second was commissioned in 2012.

See also

Alpaslan-2 Dam – sister dam downstream, completed in 2021
List of dams and reservoirs in Turkey

External links
Alpaslan-1 Dam at DSI website

References

Dams in Muş Province
Hydroelectric power stations in Turkey
Dams completed in 2010
Dams on the Murat River